Temelín is a municipality and village in České Budějovice District in the South Bohemian Region of the Czech Republic. It has about 900 inhabitants.

Administrative parts
Villages of Březí u Týna nad Vltavou, Knín, Kočín, Křtěnov, Lhota pod Horami, Litoradlice, Podhájí, Sedlec, Temelínec and Zvěrkovice are administrative parts of Temelín.

Economy
Temelín Nuclear Power Station, one of the two Czech nuclear power plants, is located in the municipality.

Gallery

See also
Dukovany, the second Czech municipality with a nuclear power station

References

External links

Temelín Nuclear Power Station

Villages in České Budějovice District